Life of Riley is a British comedy television series, shown on BBC One and BBC HD. The show stars Caroline Quentin and Neil Dudgeon as a recently married couple, and is set around their dysfunctional family. The show also features the couple's four children, Danny (Taylor Fawcett), Katy (Lucinda Dryzek), Ted (Patrick Nolan), and Rosie (Ava and Neve Lamb). After three series the show was cancelled.

It is not to be confused with The Life of Riley, a 1940s–1950s radio show, or with a 1950s American television series which starred William Bendix as Chester A. Riley.

Airing
The first episode aired on 8 January 2009, and was shown on Thursdays at 8:00pm on BBC One. Each episode of Life of Riley also aired in high-definition on BBC HD. Series 2 was shown on Wednesdays at 7:30pm from 17 March 2010. Series 3 was shown on Wednesdays at 8:30pm from 13 April 2011.

Development
The six episode series was commissioned by Lucy Lumsden, BBC Controller, Comedy Commissioning. The show was produced by Catherine Bailey Productions Limited for BBC Scotland, and distributed by Outright Distribution Ltd. The show was written by Georgia Pritchett, and filmed at Pacific Quay Studios in Glasgow, Scotland and on location (for example at Joppa, North-East of Edinburgh). Also briefly filmed on 75 Park Avenue South.

The theme music is a cover version of The Lightning Seeds' song, "The Life of Riley".

Plot
Jim (Dudgeon) and Maddy Riley are newly-weds. Jim has two children from a previous relationship – teenagers Katy and Danny – whilst Maddy also has a child of her own – Ted – from her previous marriage; baby Rosie is the child of Jim and Maddy. The couple often try to compete with their next-door neighbours, the Weavers, who are the other principal characters in the series.

Series 1 was released on DVD on 29 March 2010. Series 2 was released on DVD on 18 April 2011 along with the transmission of the new series. Series 3 was released on DVD in late 2011.

Cast

 Caroline Quentin as Maddy Riley
 Neil Dudgeon as Jim Riley
 Heather Craney as Alison Weaver
 Lucinda Dryzek as Katy Riley
 Taylor Fawcett as Danny Riley
 Patrick Nolan as Ted Jackson
 Ava and Neve Lamb as Rosie Riley
 Richard Linnell as Anthony Weaver (Series 3)
 John Bell as Anthony Weaver
 Jordan Clarke as Adam Weaver
 Marcia Warren as Maddy's Mum, Margaret
 Richard Lumsden as Roger Weaver
 Jessica Gunning as Babysitter

Characters

Critical reception
Reviews for the first series were almost universally negative.  The Herald described it as "a palpable flop" and "unfunny in any age".  The Daily Telegraph noted that it was "another half-hour firmly on Planet Sitcom: that strange world where people behave not like anybody in real life, but merely like people in other sitcoms". The Daily Record called it a "lazy insult of a comedy". The Northern Echo observed that "there was something missing for a comedy – jokes"; The Daily Mirror comments that there are "some witty moments but these are drowned out by more regular unfunny happenings, so unimaginative and staid it's embarrassing". The Independent headlined its review of the opening episode by calling it "a marital comedy divorced from wit". Most vehemently The Sunday Mail called the show "about as funny as inflamed piles".

The second series of the show was well received by audiences, with viewing figures reaching nearly 6 million, a much higher proportion of the viewing public than the BBC usually receives in this time slot. However, it again received regular negative reviews from critics. The Herald declared that 'it lacked any of the basic ingredients of good sitcom'. The Guardian described the show as a "tired effort" The Scotsman reviewed it by noting that it "feels like a parody, this time of the kind of bland, mechanical, family sitcom they supposedly don't make anymore".

The final series garnered still more negative press comment. The Metro said that the programme was "like a cereal advert that has been spun out into a full-length TV comedy", and that its inoffensive nature felt like being "smothered by cushions"

Series overview

Episodes

Series 1 (2009)
Life of Riley'''s first series comprises six episodes, each of which are thirty minutes long.

Series 2 (2010)
In May 2009, it was confirmed that the Life of Riley'' would have a second series. It began airing on 17 March 2010.

Series 3 (2011)
A third series had been in production from October 2010; it began airing on 13 April 2011.

Ratings

International broadcast
The series is currently airing on RTÉ One on Sundays in an early morning time slot.

References

External links

Review, Leicester Mercury
Neil Dudgeon website

2000s British sitcoms
2010s British sitcoms
2009 British television series debuts
2011 British television series endings
BBC Scotland television shows
BBC television sitcoms
Television shows set in London
2000s Scottish television series
2010s Scottish television series
Films shot in Edinburgh